Albin  Marine was a Swedish boat builder. The company specialized in the design and manufacture of fiberglass sailboats. Founded in 1899, the company was wound up and its brand sold in 2008.

History
The company was founded in 1899 as a builder of marine engines and the company produced its first boat in 1929. The first fiberglass boat design produced was the Vega 27 in 1965. Some of its later sailboats were produced under contract in Taiwan.

In 2008 the company's brand was purchased by an American company and it was used for a line of powerboats, although the Swedish company ceased to exist.

Boats 

Summary of boats built by Albin  Marine:

Vega 27 - 1965
Viggen 23 - 1966
Shipman 28 - 1969
Scampi 30-2 - 1970
Singoalla 34 - 1970
Ballad 30 - 1971
Scampi 30-4 - 1973
Albin 79 - 1974
Accent 26 - 1975
Albin 82 MS - 1975
Albin 57 - 1977
Albin Express - 1978
Cumulus 28 - 1978
Albin 7.8 - 1979
Cirrus 7.8 - 1979
Stratus 36 - 1980
Nimbus 42 - 1981
Nova 33 - 1981
Delta 31 - 1983
Alpha 29 - 1984

See also
List of sailboat designers and manufacturers

References

External links

Albin Marine